Bohumil Golián (25 March 1931 – 11 January 2012) was a Slovak volleyball player who competed for Czechoslovakia in the 1964 Summer Olympics and in the 1968 Summer Olympics. He was born in Moštenica and died in Bratislava.

In 1964 he was part of the Czechoslovak team which won the silver medal in the Olympic tournament. He played six matches. Four years later he won the bronze medal with the Czechoslovak team in the 1968 Olympic tournament. He played seven matches.

References

External links
 
Obituary: Slovak Volleyball legend Bohumil Golian

1931 births
2012 deaths
Czechoslovak men's volleyball players
Olympic volleyball players of Czechoslovakia
Volleyball players at the 1964 Summer Olympics
Volleyball players at the 1968 Summer Olympics
Olympic silver medalists for Czechoslovakia
Olympic bronze medalists for Czechoslovakia
Olympic medalists in volleyball
Slovak men's volleyball players
Medalists at the 1968 Summer Olympics
Medalists at the 1964 Summer Olympics
People from Banská Bystrica District
Sportspeople from the Banská Bystrica Region
Slovak schoolteachers